Jack Gardner may refer to:

Jack Gardner (basketball) (1910–2000), college basketball coach
Jack Gardner (boxer) (1926–1978), British heavyweight boxer
Jack Gardner (general), general in the United States Army
Jack Gardner (musician) (1903–1957), American jazz musician
John Lowell Gardner (1837–1898), American art collector and philanthropist
Jack Gardner (actor) (1902–1977), American film actor in The Secret Code

See also
John Gardner (disambiguation)